JSA Bordeaux Métropole Basket is a professional basketball club based in Bordeaux, France. The club plays in the NM1, the Third-tier level league of France.

History
As a teenager, Boris Diaw started his career with JSA. Diaw also played for JSA during the 2011 NBA lockout. He was also a President of the club.

Players

Notable players

References

External links 
 Official Website 

Sport in Bordeaux
Basketball teams in France